The 2006–2007 Superprestige took place between 15 October 2006 and 17 February 2007.

Men results

Men rankings
The top 15 riders in every race score points, descending from 15 points for the winner to 1 point for number fifteen. The exceptions were Asper-Gavere and Diegem, where the points were doubled: 30 for first, 28 for second and so on to 2 points for number 15.

Women results

See also
 2006/07 UCI Cyclo-cross World Cup
 2006/07 Cyclo-cross Gazet van Antwerpen

External links
 Cyclo-cross.info 
 Superprestige 2006-2007, sportarchief.be

Superprestige
Superprestige
Cyclo-cross Superprestige